Ronald Waterman (born November 23, 1965) is a former American mixed martial artist, professional wrestler, and celebrity member of the Team Impact motivational group. He holds notable victories over Valentijn Overeem, Ricco Rodriguez, Kevin Randleman, and Mario Rinaldi. He was the only WEC Super Heavyweight Champion.

Career
Waterman began his career as a high school art teacher and wrestling coach eventually entering the professional MMA arena and becoming a veteran fighter of the UFC.

Later, Ron moved on to the pro wrestling scene via Ohio Valley Wrestling where he honed his skills during a developmental deal with World Wrestling Entertainment. Waterman went on to tour with the WWE doing house and dark matches across the country. Waterman continues to wrestle in Japan, while simultaneously maintaining a successful career in the MMA circuit and making regular appearances with Team Impact.

In his most recent fight he beat fellow American Mark Smith by arm triangle choke submission on November 29, 2008.

He was the high school wrestling coach of former UFC Interim Heavyweight Champion Shane Carwin and helped train Carwin for UFC 116.

Personal life
Waterman is married with three children. He is currently a firefighter and paramedic.

Championships and accomplishments

Mixed martial arts 
World Extreme Cagefighting
WEC Super Heavyweight Championship (One time, first; Only)
One successful title defense
X-1 Events
X-1 Heavyweight Championship (One time)

Wrestling 
New Japan Pro-Wrestling
NJPW Ultimate Royal (2005)

Mixed martial arts record

|-
| Win
| align=center| 16–6–2
| Mark Smith
| Submission (arm-triangle choke)
| BTBB - Born to be Bad
| 
| align=center| 2
| align=center| 2:16
| Loveland, Colorado, United States
| 
|-
| Loss
| align=center| 15–6–2
| Dave Herman
| TKO (punches)
| EliteXC: Return of the King
| 
| align=center| 1
| align=center| 2:19
| Honolulu, Hawaii, United States
| 
|-
| Win
| align=center| 15–5–2
| Analu Brash
| Submission (americana)
| X-1 Events - Champions
| 
| align=center| 2
| align=center| 2:10
| Honolulu, Hawaii, United States
| 
|-
| Win
| align=center| 14–5–2
| Mario Rinaldi
| TKO (punches)
| AOW - Art of War 3
| 
| align=center| 1
| align=center| 4:39
| Dallas, Texas, United States
| 
|-
| Loss
| align=center| 13–5–2
| Roger Gracie
| Submission (armbar)
| Bodog Fight - USA vs Russia
| 
| align=center| 1
| align=center| 3:38
| Vancouver, British Columbia, Canada
| 
|-
| Loss
| align=center| 13–4–2
| Ricco Rodriguez
| TKO (doctor stoppage)
| WFA: King of the Streets
| 
| align=center| 1
| align=center| 5:00
| Los Angeles, California, United States
| 
|-
| Win
| align=center| 13–3–2
| Ricco Rodriguez
| Decision (unanimous)
| WEC 16 - Clash of the Titans 2
| 
| align=center| 3
| align=center| 5:00
| Lemoore, California, United States
| 
|-
| Loss
| align=center| 12–3–2
| Tsuyoshi Kohsaka
| Decision (unanimous)
| Pancrase: Brave 10
| 
| align=center| 3
| align=center| 5:00
| Tokyo, Japan
| 
|-
| Win
| align=center| 12–2–2
| Kevin Randleman
| Submission (americana)
| Pride Final Conflict 2004
| 
| align=center| 1
| align=center| 7:44
| Saitama, Japan
| 
|-
| Win
| align=center| 11–2–2
| Keigo Takamori
| Submission (americana)
| Pancrase: Brave 5
| 
| align=center| 1
| align=center| 1:36
| Tokyo, Japan
| 
|-
| Loss
| align=center| 10–2–2
| Mirko Cro Cop
| TKO (punches and soccer kicks)
| PRIDE 27
| 
| align=center| 1
| align=center| 4:37
| Osaka, Japan
| 
|-
|  Draw
| align=center| 10–1–2
| Jimmy Ambriz
| Draw
| Pancrase - Hybrid 10
| 
| align=center| 3
| align=center| 5:00
| Tokyo, Japan
| 
|-
| Win
| align=center| 10–1–1
| Jun Ishii
| Submission (neck crank)
| Pancrase - Hybrid 9
| 
| align=center| 1
| align=center| 1:02
| Tokyo, Japan
| 
|-
| Win
| align=center| 9–1–1
| Jerry Vrbanovic
| Submission (shoulder lock)
| IFC - Global Domination
| 
| align=center| 3
| align=center| N/A
| Denver, Colorado, United States
| 
|-
| Win
| align=center| 8–1–1
| James Nevarez
| TKO (punches)
| WEC 7: This Time It's Personal
| 
| align=center| 3
| align=center| 2:31
| Lemoore, California, United States
| 
|-
| Win
| align=center| 7–1–1
| Valentijn Overeem
| Submission (americana)
| PRIDE 24
| 
| align=center| 1
| align=center| 2:18
| Fukuoka, Japan
| 
|-
| Win
| align=center| 6–1–1
| Kengo Watanabe
| Submission (americana)
| Pancrase - 2002 Anniversary Show
| 
| align=center| 1
| align=center| 2:33
| Yokohama, Japan
| 
|-
| Win
| align=center| 5–1–1
| Satoshi Honma
| Decision (unanimous)
| UFC 25
| 
| align=center| 3
| align=center| 5:00
| Tokyo, Japan
| 
|-
|  Draw
| align=center| 4–1–1
| Tim Lajcik
| Draw
| UFC 22
| 
| align=center| 3
| align=center| 5:00
| Lake Charles, Louisiana, United States
| 
|-
| Loss
| align=center| 4–1
| Andre Roberts
| KO (punches)
| UFC 21
| 
| align=center| 1
| align=center| 2:51
| Cedar Rapids, Iowa, United States
| 
|-
| Win
| align=center| 4–0
| Chris Condo
| TKO (punches)
| UFC 20
| 
| align=center| 1
| align=center| 0:28
| Birmingham, Alabama, United States
| 
|-
| Win
| align=center| 3–0
| Joshua Jenkins
| TKO (doctor stoppage)
| BRI 1 - Bas Rutten Invitational 1
| 
| align=center| 1
| align=center| 1:14
| United States
| 
|-
| Win
| align=center| 2–0
| Daniel James
| TKO (punches)
| BRI 1 - Bas Rutten Invitational 1
| 
| align=center| 1
| align=center| 0:20
| United States
| 
|-
| Win
| align=center| 1–0
| Matt Asher
| TKO (punches)
| BRI 1 - Bas Rutten Invitational 1
| 
| align=center| 1
| align=center| 0:28
| United States
|

References

External links
Official Site
Team Impact page

 

1965 births
American male mixed martial artists
Professional wrestlers from Colorado
Mixed martial artists from Colorado
Super heavyweight mixed martial artists
Mixed martial artists utilizing wrestling
World Extreme Cagefighting champions
American male professional wrestlers
Expatriate professional wrestlers in Japan
Professional wrestling trainers
Living people
Ultimate Fighting Championship male fighters